Since her debut, American singer-songwriter Lana Del Rey has embarked on 5 headlining concert tours, performed at 78 festivals, and has made 13 appearances on television shows as a guest performer. Del Rey is often noted for having headlined many music festivals, most famous Coachella in 2014, numerous BBC events, and seven Lollapalooza festivals internationally.

After the viral success of her single "Video Games" in 2011, Del Rey performed the song, and occasionally its follow-up single "Blue Jeans", on several television shows in France and England before debuting the songs on American television shows Late Night with David Letterman, Jimmy Kimmel Live!, and infamously on Saturday Night Live. Following criticism for her performance on the latter, Del Rey cancelled several television performances and instead focused on her Born to Die Tour (2011-12). The tour's success saw the re-release of her debut studio album as Born to Die: The Paradise Edition, which was supported by its lead single, "Ride". In hopes of avoiding further scrutiny in the United States, Del Rey promoted the song solely with performances on English and French programs while she further promoted her work through her second headlining tour, the Paradise Tour (2013-14).

After her second major-label release, Ultraviolence (2014), Del Rey embarked on The Endless Summer Tour in 2015, which had Grimes and Courtney Love as its supporting acts. Following this, Del Rey released her third-major label record, Honeymoon, and embarked on a promotional tour of 14 festivals in North America and Europe. Following the release of Lust for Life (2017), Del Rey embarked on a small promotional tour before announcing her fourth headlining concert tour, the LA to the Moon Tour (2018-19). The tour grossed over $22 million and had several supporting acts, including Kali Uchis, Jhene Aiko, and Børns.

On August 1, 2019, Del Rey announced The Norman Fucking Rockwell! Tour in support of her sixth studio album of the same name. The announcement came the same day as the release of the album trailer and the day after the tracklist and release date announcement.

Concert tours

Music festivals

Broadcast performances

References 

Del Rey, Lana